Princes Avenue may refer to:

Princes Avenue, Kingston upon Hull, a street in Hull, England
Princes Avenue, a street in Liverpool